Notelaea ovata is a shrub in the olive family, found in eastern Australia. Growing up to a metre high, found mostly in coastal districts north from Narooma. This plant was first mentioned in the scientific literature in 1810, in the Prodromus Florae Novae Hollandiae, authored by Scottish botanist, Robert Brown. One of the many plants listed with a type as "(J.) v.v.". Brown collected samples at Port Jackson in the early years of the 19th century.

References

ovata
Trees of Australia
Flora of New South Wales
Flora of Queensland
Plants described in 1810
Taxa named by Robert Brown (botanist, born 1773)